The county of the Vexin was a medieval French county that was later partitioned between the Vexin Français (French Vexin) and the Vexin Normand (Norman Vexin).

Carolingian counts 
 753-764 Romuald, survivor of the Battle of Poitiers (732)
 in 790 Griffon
 796 Riferus
 (date unknown) Regnauld
 about 851-864 Geilenus, count of Meulan

Nibelungs 
 864-after 879 Nibelung IV
 Theodoric I, his son
 886 Adelram III and Theodoric II, defenders of Pontoise, nephews of Theodoric I

House of Valois-Vexin-Amiens 
 about 895-919 Ermenfroi, also count of Amiens and Valois
 915-926 Ralph I d'Ostrevent, also count of Amiens and Valois
 926-943 Ralph II, also count of Amiens and Valois, son of preceding
 943-after 992 Walter I, also count of Amiens and Valois, apparently brother of preceding
 about 998-after 1017 Walter II the White, also count of Amiens and Valois, son of preceding
 about 1024-1035 Drogo, also count of Amiens, son of preceding
 1035-1063 Walter III, also count of Amiens, Valois and Maine, son of preceding
 1063-1074 Ralph IV, also count of Valois and Amiens, son of Ralph III of Valois and grandson of Walter II
 1074-1077 Simon, also count of Valois and Amiens, he became a monk and his properties were dispersed, Vexin being partitioned between the Duke of Normandy and the King of France

 1092-1108 Louis of France, son of king Philip I of France, made count of Vexin Français, later crowned king Louis VI of France

House of Bourbon 
 1673-1683 Louis-César de Bourbon (1673-1683), legitimized infant son of Louis XIV of France and Madame de Montespan;

Vexin